Due Carrare is a comune (municipality) in the Province of Padua in the Italian region Veneto, located about  southwest of Venice and about  south of Padua.

This municipality  is the result of the merging of two different municipalities (Carrara San Giorgio and Carrara Santo Stefano), voted by the inhabitants on 26 February 1995 and allowed by the consequent regional law on 21 March 1995.

Due Carrare borders the following municipalities: Abano Terme, Battaglia Terme, Cartura, Maserà di Padova, Montegrotto Terme, Pernumia.

The city is the birthplace of the Carraresi family, who ruled Padua in the late Middle Ages.

See also
Carraresi

References

External links
 Official website

Cities and towns in Veneto